Betty Louise McCollum   (born July 12, 1954) is an American politician serving as the U.S. representative for , serving since 2001. She is a member of the Democratic-Farmer-Labor Party (DFL). McCollum's district centers on St. Paul, Minnesota's capital city. She is the second woman elected to Congress from Minnesota. McCollum became the dean of Minnesota's congressional delegation in 2021.

Before her election to the U.S. House, McCollum served eight years as a state representative.

Biography
McCollum was born in Minneapolis, Minnesota. She graduated from the College of St. Catherine in St. Paul, Minnesota, in 1976. McCollum has worked as a high school social sciences teacher and as a sales manager.

She first won election to the North St. Paul city council in 1986. In 1992 she was elected to the Minnesota House of Representatives after she defeated an incumbent state representative in the DFL primary. She served four terms in the Minnesota House before being elected to Congress in 2000.

U.S. House of Representatives

Campaigns

After 4th district Representative Bruce Vento decided not to seek a 13th term due to illness in 2000 (he died before the election), McCollum won the DFL nomination to succeed him. The district is heavily Democratic; among Minnesota's congressional districts, only the neighboring Minneapolis-based 5th district is considered more Democratic. The DFL has held the seat without interruption since 1949. 

McCollum's main concern during the campaign wasn't her Republican opponent, State Senator Linda Runbeck, but Independence Party candidate Tom Foley. Foley had previously been county attorney for Ramsey County (almost all of which is in the 4th district) as a Democrat. Many thought Foley might siphon off enough votes from McCollum to allow Runbeck to win. However, McCollum defeated Runbeck by a 17-point margin, with Foley in a distant third place. Foley held McCollum to 48% of the vote, making her the only Democrat not to win at least 50% of the vote since Democrats began their present dominance in the district. The district has since reverted to form, and McCollum has been reelected nine times with no substantive opposition.

Tenure
According to the McCourt School of Public Policy at Georgetown University, McCollum held a Bipartisan Index Score of -0.1 in the 116th United States Congress for 2019, which placed her 219th out of 435 members. Based on FiveThirtyEight's congressional vote tracker at ABC News, McCollum voted with Donald Trump's stated public policy positions 11.4% of the time, which ranked her average in the 116th United States Congress when predictive scoring (district partisanship and voting record) is used.

Committee assignments
For the 117th Congress, McCollum has the following committee assignments:
Committee on Appropriations
Subcommittee on Agriculture, Rural Development, Food and Drug Administration, and Related Agencies
Subcommittee on Defense (Chair)
Subcommittee on Interior, Environment, and Related Agencies
Committee on Natural Resources
Subcommittee on Energy and Mineral Resources
Subcommittee for Indigenous Peoples of the United States

McCollum has previously served on: 
Committee on Education and the Workforce, in the 107th Congress. 
Committee on Government Reform, in the 108th Congress. 
Committee on Resources, in the 107th Congress. 
Committee on the Budget, in the 112th Congress.
McCollum is a longtime member of the House Appropriations Committee, where she remains the only Minnesotan. At the start of the 111th Congress, she was also appointed to the House Budget Committee. House Democrats are not normally allowed to serve on another committee when they also serve on one of the chamber's four exclusive "A" committees—Appropriations, Energy and Commerce, Rules, and Ways and Means—but Speaker Nancy Pelosi and committee chairman Henry Waxman granted McCollum a waiver allowing her to take a second committee slot. McCollum served on the Government Reform Committee during her first term in Congress.

Party leadership, caucus, and other memberships
Senior Whip
Co-founder of the Congressional Global Health Caucus
Co-founder of the Quality Care Coalition
Vice Chair of Congressional Native American Caucus (Co-Chair Emeritus)
National Council on the Arts
Congressional Asian Pacific American Caucus (Associate Member)
Congressional Caucus on Global Road Safety
International Conservation Caucus
Congressional Arts Caucus
Afterschool Caucuses 
Co-Chair United States Congressional International Conservation Caucus
Veterinary Medicine Caucus

McCollum is the first woman elected to Congress from Minnesota since Coya Knutson in the 1950s.

McCollum received a 91% progressive rating from Progressive Punch, a self-described nonpartisan group that provides a "searchable database of Congressional voting records from a Progressive perspective", and a 13% conservative rating from the conservative SBE Council.

Political positions 
McCollum is pro-choice and supports Planned Parenthood, NARAL Pro-Choice America, and National Family Planning & Reproductive Health Association. The latter organization aims to provide access to family planning and reproductive health care services and advocates for reproductive freedom. She indicated on the 2002 National Political Awareness Test that she believed abortions should always be legally available, but only within the first trimester of pregnancy.

McCollum has consistently supported the rights of members in the LGBTQ community. The Human Rights Campaign, one of America's largest civil rights organization working to achieve lesbian, gay, bisexual and transgender equality, has continually approved of her voting record. In a speech opposing the proposed Federal Marriage Amendment, McCollum said, "Gay and lesbian Americans are citizens who must never be treated as second-class citizens".

She has supported the interests of the elderly with regard to preserving Social Security. She has backed organizations such as the Alliance for Retired Americans and the National Committee to Preserve Social Security and Medicare, which share the mission to ensure social and economic justice and full civil rights for all citizens so that they may enjoy lives of dignity, personal and family fulfillment and security. In a position paper, McCollum defended her position on Social Security, writing, "We can secure the future of Social Security with common sense and a shared, bipartisan commitment to economic security and fiscal responsibility for all Americans. This is my commitment, and you can count on me to work to protect Social Security and to find a solution that truly protects the retirement security of every American."

McCollum advocates shifting America's energy consumption to cleaner, non-carbon-based sources. Along with Al Franken and Kit Bond, she introduced the Renewable Energy and Efficiency Act, a bill to utilize thermal energy sources and create renewable energy production tax credits. She also voted for the American Recovery and Reinvestment in 2009.

In 2004, McCollum gained national visibility when she and fellow Democrat Jim McDermott of Washington called for Secretary of Education Rod Paige to resign for claiming the National Education Association was "a terrorist organization."

She also introduced amendments in June 2011 and 2012 to cut funding for military bands by $125 million, a proposal opposed by the Fleet Reserve Association and which the National Association for Music Education called "potentially devastating."

McCollum opposes Conceal-and-Carry legislation and voted against Right-to-Carry reciprocity in November 2011.

In July 2019, McCollum voted against a House resolution introduced by Representative Brad Schneider of Illinois opposing the Global Boycott, Divestment, and Sanctions Movement targeting Israel. The resolution passed 398-17. In February 2020, McCollum called AIPAC a hate group and accused it of hate speech.

In April 2021, McCollum introduced the Defending the Human Rights of Palestinian Children and Families Living under Israeli Military Occupation Act, a bill that aims to prohibit US aid from being used by Israel to detain Palestinian minors, demolish Palestinian homes and further annex West Bank land. The bill requires the State Department to file an annual report to Congress detailing the extent to which US aid from the previous fiscal year was used to bankroll any of the aforementioned activities.

Electoral history

See also
 United States congressional delegations from Minnesota
 List of United States representatives from Minnesota
 Women in the United States House of Representatives

References

Further reading
Betty McCollum, A Letter to AIPAC, New York Review of Books, Volume 53, Number 10, June 8, 2006, with an introduction by Michael Massing.

External links

Congresswoman Betty McCollum official U.S. House website
Betty McCollum for Congress

Minnesota Legislators Past and Present

|-

1954 births
21st-century American politicians
21st-century American women politicians
Democratic Party members of the United States House of Representatives from Minnesota
Female members of the United States House of Representatives
Living people
Democratic Party members of the Minnesota House of Representatives
Minnesota city council members
Politicians from Saint Paul, Minnesota
St. Catherine University alumni
Women state legislators in Minnesota